The 1976–77 NCAA Division II men's ice hockey season began in November 1976 and concluded in March of the following year. This was the 13th season of second-tier college ice hockey.

Regular season

Season tournaments

Standings

See also
 1976–77 NCAA Division I men's ice hockey season
 1976–77 NCAA Division III men's ice hockey season

References

External links

 
NCAA